The Supreme Court Historical Society (SCHS) is a Washington, D.C.-based private, nonprofit organization dedicated to preserving and communicating the history of the U.S. Supreme Court. The Society was founded in 1974 by U.S. Chief Justice Warren E. Burger, who acted as its first honorary chairman until his death in 1995. The Society publishes the Journal of Supreme Court History with John Wiley & Sons, and provides other educational materials.

Controversy

Faith and Action influence investigation 
In July 2022, Rev. Rob Schenck, former head of Faith and Action in the Nation's Capital, revealed the NPO's program of, "for about two decades, forging friendships with conservative justices to 'bolster' their views, particularly on abortion", finessed by donating to the Supreme Court Historical Society to obtain stealth opportunities to meet Supreme Court Justices. Schenck also alerted Chief Justice John Roberts of the extensive operation, by letter, that same month. Access was integral to the "group’s extensive program to influence Justices Thomas, Alito and Scalia through meals and entertainment", dubbed "Operation Higher Court". 

Schenck advised people attending the Historical Society annual dinner "see a Justice − boldly approach." He wrote "Your presence alone telegraphs a very important signal to the justices: Christians are concerned about the court and the issues that come before it." Schenck further advised that Justices were more likely to let their guard down at the annual dinners, because they trusted the attendees. In example, through their connection to the Historical Society, Hobby Lobby's owners attended a Christmas party in Supreme Court chambers shortly before litigation was initiated which would become Burwell v. Hobby Lobby Stores, Inc. in 2014.

On December 8, 2022, the House Committee on the Judiciary convened a hearing to determine covert activity and influence on SCOTUS members by the Faith and Action group, entitled "Undue Influence: Operation Higher Court and Politicking at SCOTUS", chaired by Jerrold Nadler.

The New York Times report 
On December 30, 2022, The New York Times published an investigative report detailing the society as a "vehicle for those seeking access" to Supreme Court justices. The Times determined that at least 60 percent of money the society had raised since 2003 were from "corporations, special interest groups, or lawyers and firms that argued cases before the court." The article stated that these donors were given access to the inner workings of the court, including the justices themselves.

References

External links
 
 
 

Supreme Court of the United States
Organizations established in 1974
1974 establishments in Washington, D.C.
Non-profit organizations based in Washington, D.C.
Historical societies of the United States